Sylvia Ann Grider (born 1940) is an American folklorist, noted for her research into such topics as ghosts, child lore and the memorialization of tragic events.

She served as president of the American Folklore Society,1993–94.

Early life and education 
Grider was born in Pampa, Texas, in 1940.  She attended Pampa High School, graduating in 1959.

Through a Cabot Scholarship she attended the University of Texas at Austin, graduating with a BA in Latin in 1963 and then a MA in history (with a minor in classical civilization.) in 1967.  Between these degrees she taught at Caprock High School in Amarillo, Texas.

During her time at the University of Texas, Grider took part in an archaeological excavation of Corinth in Greece.  Grider later credited her time in Greece with inadvertently inspiring her interest in folklore, feeling that “the folktales and legends that the Greek workmen told were much more exciting...than the excavation”.

Grider taught at N. R. Crozier Technical High School in Dallas before undertaking a Ph.D. at the Folklore Institute at Indiana University, which she completed in 1976.

Career 
Grider joined Texas A&M University in 1976.  She taught Folklore classes in the departments of English, History, and Humanities in Medicine. She was Assistant Dean of the Graduate College from 1981 to 1984 and would later be based in the Department of Anthropology from 1988 to 2007.

Aggie Bonfire 
After the fatal collapse of the Aggie Bonfire in 1999, Grider directed the university's Bonfire Memorabilia Collection Project, documenting and archiving all of the shrines to the bonfire which were created on the A&M campus.

Recognition 
Grider has served as president of the Texas Folklore Society, president of the American Folklore Society, and as delegate to the American Council of Learned Studies.

Selected publications 
 Grider, Sylvia Ann (1975). "Con Safos: Mexican-Americans, Names and Graffiti". The Journal of American Folklore. 88 (348): 132–142. . .
 Grider, Sylvia Ann (1975). "The Shotgun House in Oil Boomtowns of The Texas Panhandle". Pioneer America. 7 (2): 47–55. .
 Grider, Sylvia Ann (1980). "The Study of Children's Folklore". Western Folklore. 39 (3): 159–169. . .
 Grider, Sylvia Ann (1980). "A Select Bibliography of Childlore". Western Folklore. 39 (3): 248–265. .
 Grider, Sylvia (1995). "Passed down from Generation to Generation: Folklore and Teaching". The Journal of American Folklore. 108 (428): 178–185. . .
 Grider, Sylvia Ann (1997), Tuleja, Tad (ed.), "How Texans Remember the Alamo", Usable Pasts, Traditions and Group Expressions in North America, University Press of Colorado, pp. 274–290, retrieved 2022-02-17
 Grider, Sylvia Ann and Rodenberger, Lou Halsell (eds.) (1997) Texas women writers : a tradition of their own.  (1st ed ed.). College Station: Texas A & M University Press. 1997. . .
 Grider, Sylvia (2001). "Spontaneous Shrines: A Modern Response to Tragedy and Disaster Update note: 3/1/02". New Directions in Folklore. 5. .
 Grider, Sylvia Ann and Rodenberger, Lou Halsell (eds.) (2003)  Let's hear it : stories by Texas women writers. College Station: Texas A & M University Press. 2003. . OCLC 51905754.
 Goldstein, Diane E., Grider, Sylvia Ann, Thomas, Jeannie B. (2007). Haunting experiences: ghosts in contemporary folklore. Logan, Utah: Utah State University Press. . .
 Grider, Sylvia (2007). "Public Grief and the Politics of Memorial: Contesting the Memory of 'the Shooters' at Columbine High School". Anthropology Today. 23 (3): 3–7. .
 Grider, S. (2011). Memorializing Shooters with Their Victims: Columbine, Virginia Tech, Northern Illinois University. In P. J. Margry & C. Sánchez-Carretero (Eds.), Grassroots Memorials: The Politics of Memorializing Traumatic Death (1st ed., pp. 108–142). Berghahn Books.

References 

1940 births
American folklorists
Women folklorists
Presidents of the American Folklore Society
Living people